Kheyrabad (also Romanized as Kheyrābād; also known as Khairābād) is a village in Balvard Rural District, in the Central District of Sirjan County, Kerman Province, Iran. At the 2006 census, its population was 27, in 6 families.

References 

Populated places in Sirjan County